The 1986–87 Washington Huskies men's basketball team represented the University of Washington for the 1986–87 NCAA Division I men's basketball season. Led by second-year head coach Andy Russo, the Huskies were members of the Pacific-10 Conference and played their home games on campus at Hec Edmundson Pavilion in Seattle, Washington.

Washington played in the National Invitation Tournament and advanced to the quarterfinals.  They defeated Montana State in overtime in  then Boise State in Seattle, but fell at Nebraska to end the season

Postseason results

|-
!colspan=6 style=| Pacific-10 Tournament

|-
!colspan=6 style=| National Invitation Tournament

References

External links
Sports Reference – Washington Huskies: 1986–87 basketball season

Washington Huskies men's basketball seasons
Washington Huskies
Washington
Washington
Washington